This is a list of the Alpha Epsilon Pi chapters. Active chapters noted in bold, inactive chapters noted with italics.

Undergraduate chapters

Alumni clubs

References

chapters
Lists of chapters of United States student societies by society